Lunegrade is a 1946 French drama film directed by Marc Allégret starring Gaby Morlay, Jean Tissier and Saturnin Fabre. It is based on a novel by Pierre Benoit. It was shot in 1944 but had a delayed release. It recorded admissions in France of 1,587,359.

The film's sets were designed by the art directors Paul Bertrand and Lucien Carré.

Cast

References

Bibliography
 Goble, Alan. The Complete Index to Literary Sources in Film. Walter de Gruyter, 1999.

External links
Lunegarde at IMDb

1946 films
Films based on works by Pierre Benoit
Films directed by Marc Allégret
1940s French-language films
1946 drama films
French drama films
Pathé films
French black-and-white films
1940s French films